Iceland's first ambassador to Japan was Magnús V. Magnússon in 1958. Iceland's current ambassador to Japan is Stefán Haukur Jóhannesson.

List of ambassadors

See also
 Iceland–Japan relations
 Foreign relations of Iceland
 Ambassadors of Iceland

References
List of Icelandic representatives (Icelandic Foreign Ministry website) 

Main
Japan
Iceland